Phenyl acetate is the ester of phenol and acetic acid. It can be produced by reacting phenol (Which can be produced by decarboxylation of aspirin)with acetic anhydride or acetyl chloride.

Phenyl acetate can be separated into phenol and an acetate salt, via saponification: heating the phenyl acetate with a strong base, such as sodium hydroxide, will produce phenol and an acetate salt (sodium acetate, if sodium hydroxide were used).

References

Acetate esters
Phenol esters